Air Commodore Redford Henry Mulock,  (11 August 1886 – 23 January 1961) was a Canadian aviator and flying ace. He was the first Canadian flying ace of the First World War and the first in the Royal Naval Air Service, achieving five aerial victories by May 1916.

Military career
Mulock joined 13 Battery, Canadian Field Artillery in 1911. He enrolled in the Canadian Expeditionary Force in September 1914 and served as a corporal with the 1st Battery, 1st Brigade, and 12th Battery, 3rd Brigade, Canadian Field Artillery in Canada and England until December 1915. After transferring to the Royal Naval Air Service and undergoing pilot training, he was posted to 1 Naval Wing. Although he first saw combat in July 1915, he did not score his first win until 30 December. He then scored on 24 and 26 January 1916, and twice on 21 May 1916. Four of the victories were of the "out of control" variety; the other was "forced to land".

Mulock received a Distinguished Service Order (DSO) on 22 June 1916. In 1917, he was promoted to command of No. 3 Squadron RNAS; in September, he was awarded the French Legion of Honour. A Bar to his DSO followed in April 1918, along with a promotion to wing commander. He was Mentioned in Despatches three times.

After the war, Mulock served with the Royal Canadian Air Force Reserve, rising to the rank of air commodore by 1935. He then left the military and joined Canadian Airways.

In 2010, Mulock was posthumously inducted into the Canada's Aviation Hall of Fame.

References

Additional sources
 Above the Trenches: a Complete Record of the Fighter Aces and Units of the British Empire Air Forces 1915–1920. Christopher F. Shores, Norman L. R. Franks, Russell Guest. Grub Street, 1990. , .
 Shorty – An Aviation Pioneer: The Story of Victor John Hatton. James Glassco Henderson. Trafford Publishing 2004. .
 Courage in the Air. Arthur Bishop. McGraw-Hill Ryerson Ltd. 1992. .

1886 births
1961 deaths
Canadian Aviation Hall of Fame inductees
Canadian Commanders of the Order of the British Empire
Canadian Companions of the Distinguished Service Order
Canadian Expeditionary Force soldiers
Canadian World War I flying aces
Chevaliers of the Légion d'honneur
People from Winnipeg
Royal Air Force officers
Royal Air Force personnel of World War I
Royal Canadian Air Force officers
Royal Naval Air Service aviators
Royal Naval Air Service personnel of World War I